Women's Health Care Nurse Practitioner-Board Certified (WHNP-BC) is the designation for a women's health nurse practitioner who has earned nursing board certification from the National Certification Corporation.

See also

List of nursing credentials

External links
National Certification Corporation website

Nursing credentials and certifications
Advanced practice registered nursing
Women's health